New Territories is the debut album by London-based music producer Eric Lau.

The album was released to critical acclaim, with Straight No Chaser claiming "New Territories represents the arrival of a talented artist and perceptive one-man production house."

Track listing

Personnel 

 Alex Reeve - Guitar
 Annabel Annan-Jonathan - Vocals
 Eric Lau – Production, Mixing 
 Finn Peters – Flute
 Jodi Milliner – Bass Guitar, Rhodes
 Julian Ferraretto – Violin
 Layla Rutherford - Background Vocals, Claps, Finger Snaps
 Meshach Brown - Vocals
 Rahel – Vocals
 Sarina Leah - Vocals
 Tawiah - Vocals
 Tosin – Rhodes, Vocals

References

2007 albums
Eric Lau albums
Ubiquity Records albums